Wass's pipefish (Festucalex wassi) is a species of marine fish of the family Syngnathidae. It is known from only six species, which were found in the coastal waters of Papua New Guinea, New Caledonia, Fiji, and Samoa. Little is known of the species’ feeding habits, but it is expected to eat small crustaceans, similar to other pipefish. This species is ovoviviparous, with males carrying eggs and giving birth to live young. The specific name honours the U.S. Fish & Wildlife Service biologist Richard C. Wass.

References

Further reading
Encyclopedia of Life

wassi
Marine fish
Fish described in 1977